Nancy Flagg Gibney (1922–12 February 1980) was an American magazine writer and editor who moved from New York City to St. John, United States Virgin Islands. Her family's property is now known as Gibney Beach on Hawksnest Bay in St. John.

Early career 
She was born in 1921 in Boston, Massachusetts, the daughter of J. Francis Flagg, the New England manager of Macmillan Publishers. She graduated from Smith College in 1942. At Smith, she won Vogue magazine's Prix de Paris writing competition. The award came with a year's internship in the magazine's Paris office, but due to the war, she worked in Manhattan. She later became an editor in the Vogue feature department, working under the legendary editor in chief, Edna Woolman Chase. She wrote pieces for Vogue, Good Housekeeping, and Redbook.

In the early 1940s she became friends with a group of writers and artists centered around Columbia University. Among the group was painter Ad Reinhardt, poet Robert Lax, and New Yorker cartoonist Charles Saxon. She met Thomas Merton in Olean, New York, in 1941. Merton mentions her in his autobiography, The Seven Storey Mountain: 
And when Nancy Flagg was there, she sat in the same sun, and combed her hair, which was marvelous red-gold and I hope she never cut it short for it gave glory to God. And on those days I think Peggy Wells read the Bible out loud to Nancy Flagg.

Also in the group was the writer, sculptor and painter Robert Gibney, who had graduated from Columbia in 1936 and was friends with Merton and Lax. She dated Gibney and the couple married in 1946. On their honeymoon they visited the United States Virgin Islands, and ended up staying on St. John for the remainder of their lives.

Move to St. John 
In 1950 Nancy and Robert Gibney bought property on St. John in Hawksnest Bay. They built a stone house close to the beach. In 1957, the Gibneys sold a parcel of their land to atomic scientist J. Robert Oppenheimer and his wife, Kitty. Oppenheimer's house was designed by Wallace Harrison, lead architect for the United Nations headquarters complex. Today the house is a community center.

Artist Ad Reinhardt and poet Robert Lax stayed with Nancy and Robert on St. John while Lax was working on his long poem "The Circus of the Sun."

The couple had three children, Edward, John, and Eleanor. Robert Gibney died in November 1973 on St. Thomas.

Nancy Gibney died of cancer on 12 February 1980 at her home on Hawksnest Bay.

Gibney Beach 
In 1950, the Gibneys bought a  parcel on Hawksnest Bay and constructed a house just inland from the center of the beach. Gibney Beach is at the eastern end of Hawksnest Bay. Drivers enter via the third driveway on the left after passing Hawksnest Beach. Limited parking is available. Walk through the door in the iron gate and walk down the driveway to the shore.

After Nancy Gibney died, the property was left to her three children.

References 

1922 births
1980 deaths
Writers from New York City
Smith College alumni
People from Saint John, U.S. Virgin Islands